Lawrence Arthur Cremin (October 31, 1925 – September 4, 1990) was an educational historian and administrator.

Biography
Cremin attended Townsend Harris High School in Queens, and then received his B.A. and M.A. from City College of New York.  His Ph.D. is from Columbia University in 1949.  He began teaching at the Teachers College, Columbia University in New York City. He married Charlotte Raup, the daughter of two other Columbia professors: educational psychologist Robert Bruce Raup of Teachers College, and economist Clara Eliot of Barnard College.

In 1961 he became the Frederick A. P. Barnard Professor of Education and a member of Columbia's history department, directing the Teachers College's Institute of Philosophy and Politics of Education in 1965-1974 before becoming the college's 7th president in 1974–1984, after which he returned to teaching and research.

At the Teachers College, Cremin broadened the study of American educational history beyond the school-centered analysis dominant in the 1940s with a more comprehensive approach that examined other agencies and institutions that educated children, integrating the study of education with other historical subfields, and comparing education across international boundaries.

Cremin was a member of both the American Academy of Arts and Sciences and the American Philosophical Society.

In 1985 while remaining on the Columbia faculties, he assumed the presidency of the Spencer Foundation, a Chicago-based educational research organization.

Cremin won the 1962 Bancroft Prize in American History for his book The Transformation of the School: Progressivism in American Education, 1876–1957 (1961), which described the anti-intellectual emphasis on non-academic subjects and non-authoritarian teaching methods that occurred as a result of mushrooming enrollment.  He was awarded the 1981 Pulitzer Prize for History for American Education: The National Experience, 1783-1876 (1980).

In 1990 Cremin published Popular Education and Its Discontents before dying of a sudden heart attack.

Debates
The historiography of education turned bitter in the 1960s, as New Left radical historians denounced the history of American education as a failure when it came to promoting democracy and equality. Cremin avoided the debates, although in 1977 he did make clear his support for the traditional liberal interpretation. While admitting that occasionally educational institutions, being human, “have been guilty of their full share of evil, venality, and failure" he argued:
Contrary to the drift of a good deal of scholarly opinion during the past ten years, I happen to believe that on balance the American education system has contributed significantly to the advancement of liberty, equality, and fraternity, in that complementarity and tension that mark the relations among them in a free society....The aspirations of American education have been more noble than base, and that its performance over the past two centuries has been more liberating of a greater diversity of human energies and potentialities than has been the case in most other eras and in most other places.

Publications
 The American Common School: An Historic Conception. New York: Bureau of Publications, Teachers College, Columbia University, 1951, OCLC 01330861
 
 The Wonderful World of Ellwood Patterson Cubberley: An Essay On The Historiography of American Education. New York: Bureau of Publications, Teachers College, Columbia University, 1965.
 The Genius of American Education. University of Pittsburg Press, 1965. LCCN 65-28146
 Public Education
 Traditions of American Education
 American Education: The Colonial Experience, 1607-1783
 
 American Education: The Metropolitan Experience, 1876-1980

References

Bibliography

 
  (book review)
  (interview with Cremin)
 Kelly, Matthew Gardner. "The mythology of schooling: the historiography of American and European education in comparative perspective." Paedagogica Historica 50.6 (2014): 756-773.
  (book review)
  (fulltext)
  (fulltext)

External links
  (video of interview with Cremin)
 Lawrence A. Cremin Papers, 1932-2007 at Columbia University, New York, NY

Columbia Graduate School of Arts and Sciences alumni
Columbia University faculty
Teachers College, Columbia University faculty
Historians of the United States
Pulitzer Prize for History winners
1925 births
1990 deaths
American historians of education
Scholars of American education
Townsend Harris High School alumni
20th-century American historians
Education school deans
20th-century American male writers
American male non-fiction writers
Historians from New York (state)
Bancroft Prize winners
Members of the American Philosophical Society